Tenuidactylus elongatus, also known as the Yangihissar gecko or Kashghar thin-toed gecko, is a lizard species in the genus Tenuidactylus. Its type locality is Yangihissar. It is found in Turkestan, southern Mongolia, and China.

References

Tenuidactylus
Reptiles described in 1875